Sergiy Matveyev (born 29 January 1975 in Myronivka) is a Ukrainian former professional road bicycle racer.

Major results 

1995
 2nd  Team pursuit, UCI Track World Championships
1997
 2nd  Team pursuit, UCI Track World Championships
1998
 1st  Team pursuit, UCI Track World Championships (with Alexander Symonenko, Oleksandr Fedenko & Ruslan Pidgornyy)
1999
 1st  Time trial, National Road Championships
2000
 1st Grand Prix Europa (with Dario Andriotto)
 2nd  Team pursuit, Summer Olympics (with Sergiy Chernyavsky, Alexander Symonenko, Oleksandr Fedenko)
 2nd Giro d'Oro
 8th Time trial, UCI Road World Championships 
2001
 1st Stage 1 Circuit des Mines
 4th Coppa Bernocchi
 7th Giro d'Oro
 8th Giro della Provincia di Siracusa
2002
 5th Overall Circuit des Mines
1st Stage 3a (ITT)
 6th GP Eddy Merckx
2003
 National Road Championships
1st  Time trial
2nd Road race
 3rd Coppa Bernocchi
 5th GP Nobili Rubinetterie
2004
 1st Firenze–Pistoia
 2nd Time trial, National Road Championships
2005
 1st Firenze–Pistoia
 2nd Time trial, National Road Championships
 9th Overall Regio-Tour
 10th Overall Circuit de Lorraine
2006
 1st Stage 9 (ITT) Tour de Langkawi
 5th Overall Circuit de la Sarthe
2007
 1st GP de la Ville de Rennes
 2nd Time trial, National Road Championships
 4th Overall Three Days of De Panne
2008
 2nd Time trial, National Road Championships
 8th Overall Ronde de l'Oise

External links 

Results by Panaria website

Ukrainian male cyclists
1975 births
Living people
Olympic cyclists of Ukraine
Olympic silver medalists for Ukraine
Cyclists at the 2000 Summer Olympics
Cyclists at the 2004 Summer Olympics
Olympic medalists in cycling
People from Myronivka
UCI Track Cycling World Champions (men)
Medalists at the 2000 Summer Olympics
Ukrainian track cyclists
Sportspeople from Kyiv Oblast